A heuristic is a kind of method for solving a problem.

Heuristic may also refer to:
 Heuristic (computer science), a type of algorithm that produces approximately correct solutions
 Heuristic (engineering), an experience-based method reducing use of calculations
 Heuristics in judgment and decision-making, discovered by research in psychology and behavioral economics
 Heuristic argument, a non-rigorous argument that relies on an analogy or intuition

See also